Dobriša Cesarić (10 January 1902 – 18 December 1980) was a Croatian poet and translator born in Požega. Cesarić is considered one of the greatest Croatian poets of the 20th century. In 1951 he became a member of the Yugoslav Academy of Sciences and Arts.

Literary work
His first appearance on the literary scene was when he was 14 years old, with the poem "" ("I love also" in Croatian) published in a youth magazine called  ("blood brother"). His poetic opus consists of ten collections of poems and a few translations.

Work as a translator
He translated from German, Russian, Italian, Bulgarian and Hungarian to Croatian.

Works

 Lirika, Zagreb, 1931. 
 Spasena svjetla, Zagreb, 1938. 
 Izabrani stihovi, Zagreb, 1942. 
 Pjesme(Voćka poslije kiše), Zagreb, 1951. 
 Knjiga prepjeva, Zagreb 1951. 
 Osvijetljeni put, Zagreb, 1953. 
 Tri pjesme, Zagreb, 1955. 
 Goli časovi, Novi Sad, 1956. 
 Proljeće koje nije moje, Zagreb, 1957. 
 Izabrane pjesme, Zagreb, 1960. 
 Poezija, Skoplje, 1965. 
 Moj prijatelju mene više nema., Zagreb, 1966. 
 Slap, izabrane pjesme, Zagreb, 1970. 
 Svjetla za daljine, Beograd, 1975. 
 Izabrana lirika, Beograd, 1975.  
 Izabrane pjesme i prepjevi, Sarajevo, 1975. 
 Pjesme. Memoarska proza, Zagreb, 1976 (Pet stoljeća hrvatske književnosti, book 113).
 Voćka poslije kiše, Zagreb, 1978.

Published posthumously 
 Spasena svjetla, Zagreb, 1985. 
 Srebrna zrnca u pjesniku, Zagreb, 1985.  
 Balada iz predgrađa, Zagreb, 1992.  
 Povratak, Zagreb, 1995.   
 Kadikad, Zagreb, 1997.  
 Dobriša Cesarić. Pjesme., ABC naklada, Zagreb, 2007. 
 Izabrana djela'', Matica hrvatska, Zagreb, 2008.

References

External links
 Umro Dobriša Cesarić 
 
 Dobriša Cesarić lyrics 
 Translated works by Dobriša Cesarić 

1902 births
1980 deaths
People from Požega, Croatia
People from the Kingdom of Croatia-Slavonia
Croatian male poets
Croatian translators
Vladimir Nazor Award winners
Members of the Croatian Academy of Sciences and Arts
Burials at Mirogoj Cemetery
20th-century translators
20th-century Croatian poets
20th-century male writers